Jonathan Chik Gei-yee is a Hong Kong television producer, director, and writer. Chik joined TVB in 1976 as a production assistant. He was an assistant for Kam Kwok-leung, who supported his career. In the early 1990s, Chik left TVB to work as a producer for ATV. Promoted to executive producer, he returned to TVB in 1994. He remained as a producer for TVB until 2012.

Chik frequently collaborates with screenwriter Chow Yuk-ming. Chik's works has won 9 awards at the TVB Anniversary Awards, including Best Drama for 2011's When Heaven Burns.

Filmography

Frequent collaborators

External links

Hong Kong Film Archive
Jonathan Chik Gei-Yee at HKMDB

Hong Kong film directors
Hong Kong screenwriters
TVB producers
Living people
Hong Kong people
Year of birth missing (living people)